The 2008 East Carolina Pirates football team represented East Carolina University in the 2008 NCAA Division I FBS football season. and plays their home games in Dowdy–Ficklen Stadium. The team was coached by Skip Holtz, who was in his fifth year with the program.

The Pirates have a local television contract with WITN-TV, an NBC affiliate located in Washington, North Carolina who elects to pick up games that are not picked up by national or regional networks, and all games are broadcast over the radio on the Pirate-ISP Sports Network. The flagship radio stations of the Pirates are Pirate Radio 1250 and 930 AM and Oldies 107.9 WNCT, both located in Greenville, North Carolina. The games are called by the "Voice of the Pirates", Jeff Charles.

Before the season
The annual Purple-Gold Spring Game was held on April 12, 2008 during the Pigskin Pigout weekend activities in downtown Greenville, North Carolina. The "Pirates" team defeated the "East Carolina" team 13-3 as the game was called off due to inclement weather.

Recruiting

Schedule

Coaching staff

Staff

Rankings

Game summaries

Virginia Tech

The meeting on August 30 was the 14th meeting between these two teams.  These two teams met last year for the first time since 2000.  Virginia Tech won that meeting and lead the head-to-head record 9-4. After a blocked field goal placed the Hokies up 16-13 over the Pirates, T.J. Lee would return the favor by blocking a Hokie punt and running it back for the game-winning touchdown, leading the Pirates to their first victory over Virginia Tech since 1992. This was the first time since 2002 that a Conference USA team had defeated a ranked BCS-conference team, and also made the Pirates the first C-USA team ever to defeat ranked teams in consecutive games (counting ECU's win over Boise State in last season's Hawaii Bowl).

West Virginia

The Mountaineers visited Greenville for the seventh time in school history, while the Pirates were looking for their first win against WVU in Greenville since September 30, 1995.  Going into the game, West Virginia led in the overall matchup, 17-2.

ECU did not need any last-minute heroics to pull off their second straight upset over a ranked BCS-conference school. Quarterback Patrick Pinkney had an almost mistake-free game, going 22-for-28 through the air with a touchdown and no interceptions, while the Pirates defense kept WVU's normally high-powered offense out of the end zone (the first time since 2001 any WVU opponent had done so). The Pirates scored their first win over a top-10 team since beating Miami in 1999.

Tulane

#14 East Carolina visited New Orleans for the first time since the 2003 football season. Before the game, the Pirates led the series against this conference foe, 7-2, with both losses occurring in the Louisiana Superdome.

For the first time in a long time, the Pirates went into a game with a national ranking, but suffered a sluggish start against the Green Wave, who the week prior had held Alabama to a single offensive touchdown. After a perfect game against the Mountaineers, the Pirates suffered four turnovers on offense as the defense struggled after losing senior Defensive Linebacker Quentin Cotton to a severe knee injury. With the Green Wave up 24-21 in the 4th, the offensive line rallied back. Patrick Pinkney completed a pass to Jamar Bryant for the touchdown and brought the Pirates up 28-24 with 1:28 remaining. Pierre Bell's interception on the next Tulane drive would end it as the Pirates managed to sail past the Green Wave with the final score 28-24.

NC State

After barely escaping past Tulane, #15 ECU visited their inter-state rival in the state capital for the 21st time in the 26 game history.  NCSU won the previous years' game 34-20 in Greenville and lead the all-time record 15-10.

Injuries were a major factor in the outcome of this game, but despite only dressing 45 of its players for the game, the Wolfpack managed to come on top over the Pirates, who fell to 3-1 overall. The key loss of Defensive Linebacker Quentin Cotton, and the two missed touchdown opportunities in the red zone for the Pirates would lead to an Overtime showdown as the score was tied at the last second, 24-24.

The Pirates came up with nothing after the first offensive series in Overtime, as Quarterback Patrick Pinkney was sacked and fumbled the ball, setting up a Wolfpack touchdown that gave the Pirates their first loss of the 2008 season, the final score: 30-24. The next time the two schools meet was pushed back to the 2010 season, to accommodate the completion of East Carolina's upcoming stadium expansion.

Houston

#23 East Carolina hosted Houston for their conference home opener at Dowdy–Ficklen Stadium.  ECU won in a shootout last fall, 37-35. The Pirates led this Conference USA West opponent overall, five games to three, but disaster would strike for a second week in a row.

The Pirate defense was unable to stop Case Keenum's 399 yard passing attack and could not muster enough offense to match it. The high-scoring Houston offense never trailed as the Pirates went down for a second straight week, losing 41-24 and was knocked out of the Top 25.

Virginia

Coming off of their first bye week, East Carolina traveled to Charlottesville for the second time in this three game history. ECU beat this ACC member in Greenville in 2006, 31-21, and led the overall series 2-0.

After going up on the board early 6-0, Virginia would rally back to make the score 28-6 at halftime. A Pirate rally in the second half would be cut short as a fumble and botched punt were recovered by the Cavaliers. The Pirates would go on to lose to Virginia for the first time in this series' history, 35-20.

Memphis

For ECU's second home conference game, they played the Tigers of Memphis.  East Carolina won last fall's game 56-40 at the Liberty Bowl, in Memphis. In the 16 previous games played between these teams, the Pirates led the Tigers 10-6.

UCF

East Carolina traveled to the Bright House Networks Stadium in Orlando for the third time in this series.  The Pirates led the series six games to one.

Marshall

The Thundering Herd traveled to North Carolina for the fifth time in this storied series.  After the 1970 contest, Marshall's plane crashed while traveling back to Huntington. The 2001 GMAC Bowl is the highest-scoring bowl game in Division I-A (now Division I FBS) history.  Marshall won 64-61 in two overtimes.  The Pirates led the series 6-3.

Southern Miss

Southern Miss hosted East Carolina in the 34th meeting of these two teams.  Of the 33 games in the history of the series, the Pirates have won only eight times.

UAB

The Pirates traveled to Birmingham for the fourth time to face the Blazers.  Before this game, East Carolina had never won a road contest at UAB's home field. UAB led the overall series 4-3.

UTEP

The Pirates welcome the Miners to Greenville for the first time ever.  East Carolina and this Conference USA West opponent are meeting for the second time.  The first meeting occurred last fall in El Paso, Texas.  ECU won in overtime, 45-42 in the Sun Bowl.

2008 Conference USA Championship

The Pirates, after clenching their division in a 17-13 win over the UAB Blazers, will be representing Conference USA East in a battle against the champion of the West division, the Tulsa Golden Hurricanes. Tulsa clenched the division title with a win over Marshall and a Houston loss to Rice. Tulsa leads the all-time series against the Pirates, 5-2.

2009 Liberty Bowl

After defeating Tulsa in the 2008 Conference USA Football Championship and winning their first Conference Championship in more than thirty years, the Pirates immediately accepted an invitation to play in the Liberty Bowl, which the team had not done in thirteen years. The last time East Carolina went to the Liberty Bowl was in 1995, where they defeated Stanford 19-13.

The Pirates faced Kentucky from the SEC and lost 17-20 after they went into overtime and lost by a field goal.

Postseason

NFL Draft picks
Davon Drew – Round 5: 13th (149th Overall) – Baltimore Ravens

Awards
Sporting News Coach-of-the-Year – Skip Holtz
Sporting News Defensive MVP – C. J. Wilson – Jr. DL
Pontiac Game Changing Performance Winner Week 1: – T.J. Lee – Sr. WR

Honors

Statistics

Team

Scores by quarter

Offense

Rushing

Passing

Receiving

Defense

Special teams

References

East Carolina
East Carolina Pirates football seasons
Conference USA football champion seasons
East Carolina Pirates football